The Chinese Elm cultivar Ulmus parvifolia 'Yatsubusa'  is a dwarf variety.

Description
The name is used both to identify a cultivar and as a group name  for particularly small-leaved variants specifically raised for bonsai culture .

Pests and diseases
The species and its cultivars are highly resistant, but not immune, to Dutch elm disease, and unaffected by the Elm Leaf Beetle Xanthogaleruca luteola.

Etymology
'Yatsubusa' is the Japanese word for 'dwarf'.

Accessions

North America

Scott Arboretum, US. Acc. no. 2000–080

Europe

Royal Horticultural Society Gardens, Wisley, UK. No details available.

Nurseries

North America

(Widely available)

Europe

(Widely available)

References

Chinese elm cultivar
Ulmus articles with images
Ulmus